Magneto was a popular Mexican boy band of the 1980s and 1990s. The band formed on February 14, 1983. In 1986, Magneto was featured in "Siempre en Domingo," a Mexican entertainment show viewed across Latin America and parts of Europe. Mexican teen pop group Magneto emerged in 1983. Their first record, Dejalo Que Gire came in 1984, followed by Super 6 Magneto. The Latin pop outfit suffered several lineup changes before achieving their first gold record in 1986. Mostly playing dance-pop songs, the five-member ensemble started touring Central America after climbing charts with "Todo Esta Muy Bien," and "Soy Un Soñador." However, their breakthrough came after issuing a Spanish-language version of Desireless' "Voyage, voyage," a French pop hit from the '80s. In 1992 the boy band played the lead in their own movie, Cambiando el Destino. Magneto won the Lo Nuestro Award for Pop New Artist of the Year, and received two nominations for the Lo Nuestro Awards of 1993: Pop Album (Magneto) and Pop Group of the Year. Nevertheless, the original Magneto disbanded in 1996 after a sold-out show at Mexico City's Auditorio Nacional. 

A number of former Magneto members (the group's 1993-1996 lineup of Alan Ibarra, Mauri Stern, Elias Cervantes, Toño Beltraneña, and Hugo de la Barreda, better known as Alex) reunited in 2009. 

In 2016, Magneto toured with Mercurio, a 1990s Mexican boy band.  In 2017, they toured with Sentidos Opuestos, Mercurio and Kabah as part of the Únete a la fiesta concert series of 1990s pop music nostalgia.
Another original member of the group was Xavier Fux, he became a famous DJ

Original members
 Francisco Mtz. Frank (Pepe Ovadia)
Elias Cervantes
 Diego Alfaro
 Iñaki Huacuja
 Enrique Oyanguren
 Jose Javier Iñiguez
 Mario Zainos (1989)
Xavier Fux
 Gohar abtab

Later members
 Jose Antonio Chapa
 Elias Cervantes
 Emiliano Balderas
Juan Botella
 Mauricio Rocha
 Hugo De la Barreda (Alex)
 Santiago Antón
 Mauri Stern (Marcos Stern Chernovetzky)
 Mario Zainos
 Alan (Erick Ibarra Miramontes)
 Antonio (Tono) Beltranena
 Paolo Mattos (vocalist)
 Carlos Martinez Gonzales (Charlie)
 Enrique Trejo

Albums
 Siempre (1995) (Always)
 Tu Libertad (1994) (Your Freedom)
 Más (1993) (More)
 Cambiando el Destino (1992) (Changing Destiny)
 Vuela, Vuela (1991) (a cover of Desireless's Voyage Voyage)
 40 Grados (1989) (40 Degrees)
 Todo esta muy bien (1987) (Everything is Extremely Well)
 Tremendo (1986) (Tremendous)
 Super 6 Magneto (1984) (Magneto Super 6)
 Dejalo que gire (1983) (Let it Spin)

Singles
 Una y Otra Vez (2001) (Once and Again)

From the album Siempre (Always)
 Para Siempre (Forever)
 No Se Decir Adios (I Don't Know How to Say Goodbye)
 La Puerta del Colegio (The high school door)
 Corazon Perfecto (1995) (Perfect Heart)

From the album Cambiando El Destino (Changing Destiny)
 Amor A Mogollon (Mogollon Love)
 Cambiando el Destino (1992) (Changing Destiny)

From the album Vuela, Vuela (Fly, Fly)
 Dejame Estar a Tu Lado (1991) (Let Me Be by Your Side)
 Huy Que Llego Tarde (1991) (Oh no, I'm Arriving late)
 Mira, Mira, Mira (1991) (Look, Look, Look)
 Oyeme (1991) (Hear Me Out)
 La Puerta del Colegio (1991) (The high school door)
 Para Siempre (1992) (Forever)
 Rezo por Mi (1992) (Pray for Myself)
 Vuela, Vuela (1991) (Fly away, Fly away)

From the album Tu Libertad (Your Freedom)
 Eva María (1995) (Eva Maria)
 Siempre Cerca de Mi (1995) (Always close to me)
 Mentira Para Dos (1995) (A Lie for Two)
 Malherido (1994) (Badly Hurt)
 Señor, Señor (1995) (Listen) (Mister, Mister)
 Tu Libertad (1994) (Your Freedom)
 Yo seré de ti (1994) (I Will Be Yours)

From the album Más (More)
 Que Sensación (1993) (What a Feeling!)
 Mi Amada (1993) (My Beloved One)
 Como Pega el Son (1993) (How the Son/Sound Hits You)
 Sugar, Sugar (1993) (cover song)
 Cambiando el Destino (1992) (Changing Destiny)
 Sueño por Sueño (1994) (Dream by Dream)

From the album X-Magneto
 Vuela, Vuela (remix) (1992)
 Vuela, Vuela (Fly away, Fly away) (1992)

From the album 40 grados (40 Degrees)
 Las palabras (with Angélica Vale) (1990) (Words)
 Obsesionado (1990) (Obsessed)
 40 grados (1989) (40 Degrees)
 Tu mejor amigo (1989) (Literally: Your Best Friend)

From the album Tremendo (Tremendous)
 Tremendo (Tremendous) (1986)
 Adolescencia (Adolescence) (1986)
 Un amigo es (A Friend is...) (1986)

From the album Todo esta muy bien (Everything is Well)
 Mi clase de amor (My Kind of Love) (1988)
 Soy un soñador (I'm a Dreamer) (1988)
 Todo esta muy bien (Everything Is Well) (1987)

Films
 Cambiando el destino (Changing Destiny) (1992)

Awards
 42 gold albums (representing 4.5 million records)
 7 platinum albums
 1 diamond album
 Eres award for:Best Pop GroupBest AlbumBest VideoBest MovieBest Song TVyNovelas Award for "Best Pop Group
 Galardón a los Grandes de la Música award
 Lo Nuestro Awards
 La Antorcha at the Viña del Mar Festival

References

External links
  Site, including history of the band on Geocities
   mauristern.com, official site of Mauri (Stern)
  Website for Magneto & Mercurio
  Twitter page for Magneto & Mercurio
  Facebook page for Magneto & Mercurio

Mexican boy bands
Mexican pop music groups
Latin pop music groups